The Monument in Commemoration of the Return of Hong Kong to China is an outdoor monument, installed in Golden Bauhinia Square, Wan Chai North, Hong Kong.

See also

 Transfer of sovereignty over Hong Kong

References

External links
 

Monuments and memorials in Hong Kong
Outdoor sculptures in Hong Kong
Wan Chai North